(originally named Pokémon Masters) is a free-to-play mobile game for Android and iOS developed and published by DeNA. It is based on the Pokémon media franchise. Set on the artificial island of Pasio, the game allows players to battle and recruit various prominent Pokémon Trainers from the main series games and anime. Originally named Pokémon Masters and released in August 2019, it was renamed Pokémon Masters EX in August 2020 on the first anniversary of the game.

Gameplay
There is a tournament of 3-on-3 battles being held on Pasio Island called the Pokémon Masters League. The main goal is to become its Champion. To enter the Pokémon Masters League, players must collect at least five Badges by defeating the PML Leaders located in Pasio. When recruiting a sync pair, the player can unlock a sync pair story. Players can also participate in limited-time events which are regularly added and updated. Events feature both single-player story events and also co-operative multiplayer events in which players must team up to defeat powerful enemies in order to receive event rewards and prizes.

Sync pairs
A sync pair is a pair consisting of one Pokémon Trainer who had previously appeared in the core games or the anime (many of whom, similar to Super Smash Bros., have their designs taken from their most recent appearances, i.e. Ash being depicted in his Journeys design) and one Pokémon (again, usually one that is best associated with that character, i.e. Ash being paired with his Pikachu) in Pokémon Masters. Each sync pair has one of three roles: strike sync pairs, which are focused on attacking; support sync pairs, which are focused on defending, healing HP, and increasing stats of the whole team; and tech sync pairs, which are focused on different tactics, such as inflicting status alterations. Sync pairs can be recruited by playing the main story, through scouting or by completing certain timed events. Occasionally, a character will get a variant of themselves that sees them wearing an alternate costume (such as a "Sygna Suit", a "seasonal costume", a "special costume", or a "classic" design) that also pairs them up with a different Pokémon that usually relates to that costume.

Development and release
Pokémon Masters was first announced by The Pokémon Company on May 28, 2019, alongside some other Pokémon games. It represents the first collaboration between the company and mobile game developer DeNA, it had been released for Android and iOS. The concept of the game came from series artist and designer Ken Sugimori who proposed the idea of having all past characters from the main series together in one game.

A preview version of the game was released in Singapore on July 25, 2019, and in Canada on August 6, 2019. The game was released worldwide on August 29, 2019, for iOS and Android phones. Unlike most other Pokémon games, Pokémon Masters was not released in Belgium and The Netherlands, likely due to bans on loot boxes.

In commemoration of the game's first anniversary, Pokémon Masters was updated with new features as Pokémon Masters EX on August 25, 2020.

Reception

Pokémon Masters EX received "mixed or average reviews" according to the review aggregator Metacritic.

Within four days of its global release, Pokémon Masters has been downloaded 10 million times and recorded $10 million in revenue. Within its first week, the revenue figures were increased to $26 million. In its first month, the game generated $33 million in revenue and $75 million within its first year.

References

Notes

External links

2019 video games
Android (operating system) games
DeNA
Free-to-play video games
Gacha games
IOS games
Video games developed in Japan
Video games featuring protagonists of selectable gender
Video games set on fictional islands
Masters
Multiplayer and single-player video games
Cooperative video games